Sommesous is a commune in the Marne department in north-eastern France.

It was the birthplace of Pierre Louis Prieur (1756-1827), French politician.

See also
Communes of the Marne department

References

Sommesous